Carles Marc Martínez Embuena (born 3 January 1988 in Paiporta, Valencian Community) is a Spanish footballer who plays as a defensive midfielder for Barakaldo CF.

References

External links

1988 births
Living people
People from Horta Sud
Sportspeople from the Province of Valencia
Spanish footballers
Footballers from the Valencian Community
Association football midfielders
Segunda División B players
Tercera División players
Valencia CF Mestalla footballers
Real Murcia players
CD San Roque de Lepe footballers
Getafe CF B players
CD Atlético Baleares footballers
CD Guijuelo footballers
Barakaldo CF footballers
Ekstraklasa players
I liga players
Piast Gliwice players
Zagłębie Sosnowiec players
ASA 2013 Târgu Mureș players
Hong Kong Premier League players
Southern District FC players
Spain youth international footballers
Spanish expatriate footballers
Expatriate footballers in Poland
Expatriate footballers in Romania
Expatriate footballers in Hong Kong
Spanish expatriate sportspeople in Poland
Spanish expatriate sportspeople in Romania
Spanish expatriate sportspeople in Hong Kong